Jabiglu (also Romanized as Jabaklū; also known as Jabīklū) is a village in Ajorluy-ye Gharbi Rural District, Baruq District, Miandoab County, West Azerbaijan Province, Iran. At the 2006 census, its population was 42, in 10 families.

References 

Populated places in Miandoab County